Kufah may refer to:
 Ovophis okinavensis, a.k.a. the Okinawa pitviper, a venomous pitviper species found in the Ryukyu Islands of Japan
 Alternative English spelling for Kufa, a city in modern Iraq

See also 
 Kufa (disambiguation)